Oreshak ( translittered as Orešak) is a village in Aksakovo Municipality in Varna Province, northeastern Bulgaria. Most of the inhabitants are either local people who have lived there for a long time, or people from Varna who have moved to Oreshak more recently. There are also some foreigners who have chosen Oreshak for a vacation place.
Most of the streets are covered with asphalt, but there are some that covered only with road-metal.

Transport 
Buses run from Varna to Oreshak every 1-2 hours. All of them stop in the village of Kichevo, and some of them continue after Oreshak to the village of Osenovo.

Villages in Varna Province